Harold Stewart Spindel (May 27, 1913 – July 28, 2002) was an American professional baseball catcher who played in 85 games in Major League Baseball catcher as a member of the St. Louis Browns and Philadelphia Phillies (–). He was born in Chandler, Oklahoma, but graduated from John C. Frémont High School in Los Angeles and played baseball for UCLA.

His professional baseball career began in 1934 in the Pacific Coast League. After five years with Seattle, he spent the entire 1939 campaign with the Browns of the American League as the club's third-string catcher, playing in 48 games and starting 26. Three more full years in the minor leagues followed, then he missed the 1943 season. In 1945, he appeared in 36 games for the Phillies, starting 25, third-most on the team. He got into one more MLB contest for Philadelphia, on June 9, 1946, and played in the minors through 1947.

Hal Spindel died at age 89 in San Clemente, California, on July 28, 2002.

References

External links

1913 births
2002 deaths
Baseball players from Los Angeles
Baseball players from Oklahoma
Los Angeles Angels (minor league) players
Major League Baseball catchers
Ogden Reds players
People from Chandler, Oklahoma
Philadelphia Phillies players
St. Louis Browns players
Seattle Indians players
Seattle Rainiers players
Toledo Mud Hens players
UCLA Bruins baseball players
John C. Fremont High School alumni